Gary Christie (born 23 January 1972) is a former professional rugby league footballer who played at representative level for Scotland, and at club level for Oldham (Heritage № 973), Wakefield Trinity and the Bradford Bulls, as a .

At the end of the 1997 season, he switched codes to rugby union to play for Widnes RUFC.

References

External links
Statistics at rugbyleagueproject.org
Statistics at orl-heritagetrust.org.uk

1972 births
Living people
Bradford Bulls players
English people of Scottish descent
English rugby league players
Oldham R.L.F.C. players
Place of birth missing (living people)
Rugby league wingers
Scotland national rugby league team players
Wakefield Trinity players